Involution is an album by multi-instrumentalist Michael Marcus, with the Jaki Byard trio.

Background
This was Marcus's third album for Justin Time Records.

Recording and music
The album was recorded in 1998. The tracks are a mix of Marcus originals and standards that are played relatively infrequently. Marcus plays a variety of saxophones: the stritch (a form of soprano), saxello (a straight alto), and a straight tenor.

Release
The album was released by Justin Time on March 30, 1998.

Reception
The AllMusic reviewer commented that this album was more conventional in style than many of Marcus's other recordings.

Track listing
"Israel" (John Carisi) – 5:46
"Quadrophonics" (Michael Marcus) – 7:43
"The Legend of Hale-Bopp" (Marcus) – 6:09
"Soultrane" (Tadd Dameron) – 7:47
"Man from Lovejoy" (Marcus) – 4:19
"Off Minor" (Thelonious Monk) – 4:55
"Sacred Law" (Marcus) – 4:33
"Dear Lord" (John Coltrane) – 4:40
"Surfer Girl" (Brian Wilson) – 2:30
"Involution" (Marcus) – 4:34

Personnel
Michael Marcus – straight tenor sax, saxello, stritch
Jaki Byard – piano
Ralph Hamperian – bass
Richard Allen – drums

References

1998 albums
Justin Time Records albums